Brockington College is a Church of England mixed secondary school in Enderby, Leicestershire, England. It is in the district of Blaby. The school became an academy on 1 August 2012.

History 
In 1957, Brockington College was erected using an intergrid prefabricated construction. Four other Leicestershire schools also used this method of construction. Due to the high maintenance costs and physical degradation of the buildings, each of these schools has now been replaced. Brockington College was part of a £19m project from September 2006 to September 2007. Being a voluntary-aided school, funding was not directly through the Building Schools for the Future scheme but shared between HM Government and the Partnership for Church Schools scheme. As such, the Church of England made a significant investment in the college and its local community. A full size artificial grass pitch was added in 2009, funded and sponsored by the FA, Next, and a number of other local sponsors.

The school converted to academy status in August 2012. Previously a middle school for pupils aged 11 to 14, in September 2015, the school changed to become an 11 to 16 secondary school.

Features of the college

Admissions 
Brockington admits children aged between 11 and 16 years old, and in recent years has drawn significant numbers of pupils from beyond its traditional catchment area. The current informal catchment extends in excess of 8 miles, centred on Enderby and Narborough while also including Croft, Huncote and Thurlaston - but reaching to Stoney Stanton, Whetstone and Blaby, Braunstone, and Leicester Forest East as families have elected to apply to Brockington rather than their local secondary schools. Ofsted noted Brockington's pastoral support as being one of the many outstanding features of the college in 2010.

Spiritual reflection
The school speaks of its "uniquely Christian ethos" and has been assessed as an "Outstanding" school as part of its Section 48 inspection. Children and staff from a number of faith backgrounds are part of the Brockington community and all beliefs are respected and considered. Local clergy host assemblies once a fortnight for each year and there is a strong Spiritual Reflection programme designed to prompt reflection among all, irrespective of their faith. There is also a Christmas and Easter service held at the local church for years 7-10.

House system 
There are four Houses within the school (Plantagenet, Stuart, Tudor, and Windsor) and pupils frequently participate in extracurricular and enrichment activities representing their House.

ICT facilities
All classrooms are equipped with LED projectors and have interactive whiteboards. There are currently five ICT rooms located on-site.

School values
The school has eight key values ('Compassion', 'Forgiveness', 'Justice', 'Koinonia’, 'Perseverance’, ‘Wisdom’, ‘Learning’ and ‘Respect’) that inform the school's assembly programme and Collective Worship Programme; these are the cornerstones for teaching within the school.

Student voice
Each tutor group has elected representatives who meet once a term, deciding priorities and liaising with the senior leadership team. Student Voice pupils also play a significant role in staff recruitment (forming formal interview panels) and the promotion of the school.

Facilities 
The college offers bookable rooms and facilities for outside groups. Regular sporting events are hosted using the College's facilities, including the 3G Artificial Grass Football Pitch (AGP), main indoor sports hall, and Multi Use Games Area (MUGA).

Notable former pupils 
 Richard Armitage, actor.

References

External links 
 College website
 EduBase

Secondary schools in Leicestershire
Church of England secondary schools in the Diocese of Leicester
Academies in Leicestershire
Educational institutions established in 1957
1957 establishments in England